Yuichi Matsushima is a Japanese engineer from the Waseda University in Tokyo, Japan. In 2012, he was named Fellow of the Institute of Electrical and Electronics Engineers (IEEE)  for "contributions to semiconductor optical devices for transoceanic optical undersea cable systems."

References

Fellow Members of the IEEE
Living people
Year of birth missing (living people)

Place of birth missing (living people)
Academic staff of Waseda University